Lethe maitrya, the  barred  woodbrown, is a species of Satyrinae butterfly found in the  Indomalayan realm.

Subspecies
L. m. maitrya   West Himalayas, Nepal, Sikkim, Bhutan
L. m. thawgawa   Tytler, 1939   Burma
L. m. metokana   Huang, 1998   Tibet 
L. m. lijiangensis   Huang, 2001   Yunnan

References

maitrya
Butterflies of Asia